The Three Musketeers is a French historical adventure novel written in 1844 by French author Alexandre Dumas. It is in the swashbuckler genre, which has heroic, chivalrous swordsmen who fight for justice.

Set between 1625 and 1628, it recounts the adventures of a young man named d'Artagnan (a character based on Charles de Batz-Castelmore d'Artagnan) after he leaves home to travel to Paris, hoping to join the Musketeers of the Guard. Although d'Artagnan is not able to join this elite corps immediately, he is befriended by three of the most formidable musketeers of the age – Athos, Porthos and Aramis, "the three musketeers" or "the three inseparables" – and becomes involved in affairs of state and at court.

The Three Musketeers is primarily a historical and adventure novel. However, Dumas frequently portrays various injustices, abuses and absurdities of the Ancien Régime, giving the novel an additional political significance at the time of its publication, a time when the debate in France between republicans and monarchists was still fierce. The story was first serialised from March to July 1844, during the July Monarchy, four years before the French Revolution of 1848 established the Second Republic.

The story of d'Artagnan is continued in Twenty Years After and The Vicomte of Bragelonne: Ten Years Later.

Origin

Dumas presents his novel as one of a series of recovered manuscripts, turning the origins of his romance into a little drama of its own. In the preface, he tells of being inspired by a scene in Mémoires de Monsieur d'Artagnan (1700), a historical novel by Gatien de Courtilz de Sandras, printed by Pierre Rouge in Amsterdam, which Dumas discovered during his research for his history of Louis XIV. According to Dumas, the incident where d'Artagnan tells of his first visit to M. de Tréville, captain of the Musketeers, and how, in the antechamber, he encountered three young Béarnese with the names Athos, Porthos and Aramis, made such an impression on him that he continued to investigate. That much is true – the rest is fiction: He finally found the names of the three musketeers in a manuscript titled Mémoire de M. le comte de la Fère, etc. Dumas "requested permission" to reprint the manuscript; permission was granted:
Now, this is the first part of this precious manuscript which we offer to our readers, restoring it to the title which belongs to it, and entering into an engagement that if (of which we have no doubt) this first part should obtain the success it merits, we will publish the second immediately.

In the meanwhile, since godfathers are second fathers, as it were, we beg the reader to lay to our account and not to that of the Comte de la Fère, the pleasure or the ennui he may experience.

This being understood, let us proceed with our story.

The Three Musketeers was written in collaboration with Auguste Maquet, who also worked with Dumas on its sequels (Twenty Years After and The Vicomte of Bragelonne: Ten Years Later), as well as The Count of Monte Cristo. Maquet would suggest plot outlines after doing historical research; Dumas then expanded the plot, removing some characters, including new ones and imbuing the story with his unmistakable style.

The Three Musketeers was first published in serial form in the newspaper Le Siècle between March and July 1844.

Plot

In 1625 France, D'Artagnan leaves his family in Gascony and travels to Paris to join the Musketeers of the Guard. At a house in Meung-sur-Loire, an older man derides D'Artagnan's horse. Insulted, D'Artagnan demands a duel. But the older man's companions instead beat D'Artagnan unconscious with a cooking pot and a metal tong that breaks his sword. His letter of introduction to Monsieur de Tréville, the commander of the musketeers, is also stolen. D'Artagnan resolves to avenge himself upon the older man, who is later revealed to be the Comte de Rochefort, an agent of Cardinal Richelieu, who is passing orders from the cardinal to his spy, Lady de Winter, usually called Milady de Winter or simply "Milady". In Paris, D'Artagnan visits Monsieur de Tréville at the headquarters of the musketeers, but without the letter, Tréville politely refuses his application. He does, however, write a letter of introduction to an academy for young gentlemen which may prepare his visitor for recruitment at a later time. From Tréville's window, D'Artagnan sees Rochefort passing in the street below and rushes out of the building to confront him, but in doing so he offends three musketeers, Athos, Porthos and Aramis, who each demand satisfaction; D'Artagnan must fight a duel with all of them that afternoon.

As D'Artagnan prepares himself for the first duel, he realizes that Athos's seconds are Porthos and Aramis, who are astonished that the young Gascon intends to duel them all. As D'Artagnan and Athos begin, Cardinal Richelieu's guards appear and attempt to arrest D'Artagnan and the three musketeers for illegal dueling. Although they are outnumbered four to five, the four men win the battle.  D'Artagnan seriously wounds Jussac, one of the cardinal's officers and a renowned fighter. After learning of this, King Louis XIII appoints D'Artagnan to Des Essart's company of the King's Guards and gives him forty pistoles. D'Artagnan hires a servant named Planchet, finds lodgings and reports to Monsieur des Essart, whose company is a less prestigious regiment in which he will have to serve for two years before being considered for the musketeers. Shortly after, his landlord speaks to him about the kidnapping of his wife, Constance Bonacieux. When she is presently released, D'Artagnan falls in love at first sight with her. She works for Queen Anne of France, who is secretly having an affair with the English duke of Buckingham. The king, Louis XIII, gave the queen a gift of diamond studs, but she gives them to her lover as a keepsake. 

Cardinal Richelieu, who wants war between France and England, plans to expose the tryst and persuades the king to demand that the queen wear the diamonds to a soirée that the cardinal is sponsoring. Constance tries to send her husband to London to fetch the diamonds from Buckingham, but the man is instead manipulated by Richelieu and thus does not go, so D'Artagnan and his friends intercede. En route to England, the Cardinal's henchmen repeatedly attack them and only D'Artagnan and Planchet reach London. Before arriving, D'Artagnan is compelled to assault and nearly to kill, the Comte de Wardes, a friend of the Cardinal, cousin of Rochefort and Milady's lover. Although Milady stole two of the diamond studs, Buckingham provides replacements while delaying the thief's return to Paris. D'Artagnan is thus able to return a complete set of jewels to Queen Anne just in time to save her honour. In gratitude, she gives him a beautiful ring. Shortly afterward, D'Artagnan begins an affair with Madame Bonacieux. Arriving for an assignation, he sees signs of a struggle and discovers that Rochefort and M. Bonacieux, acting under the orders of the Cardinal, have assaulted and imprisoned Constance. D'Artagnan and his friends, now recovered from their injuries, return to Paris. D'Artagnan meets Milady de Winter officially and recognizes her as one of the Cardinal's agents, but becomes infatuated with her until her maid reveals that Milady is indifferent toward him. 

Entering her quarters in the dark, he pretends to be the Comte de Wardes and trysts with her. He finds a fleur-de-lis branded on Milady's shoulder, marking her as a felon. Discovering his identity, Milady attempts to kill him but D'Artagnan eludes her. He is later ordered to the Siege of La Rochelle. He is informed that the queen has rescued Constance from prison. At an inn, the musketeers overhear the Cardinal asking Milady to murder Buckingham, a supporter of the Protestant rebels at La Rochelle who has sent troops to assist them. Richelieu gives her a letter that excuses her actions as under orders from the Cardinal himself, but Athos takes it. The next morning, Athos bets that he, D'Artagnan, Porthos and Aramis and their servants can hold the recaptured St. Gervais bastion against the rebels for an hour, for the purpose of discussing their next course of action. They resist for an hour and a half before retreating, killing 22 Rochellese in total; D'Artagnan is made a musketeer as a result of this feat. They warn Lord de Winter and the duke of Buckingham. Milady is imprisoned on arrival in England, but she seduces her guard, Felton (a fictionalization of the real John Felton) and persuades him to allow her to escape and to kill Buckingham himself. Upon her return to France, Milady hides in a convent where Constance is also staying. 

The naïve Constance clings to Milady, who sees a chance for revenge on D'Artagnan and fatally poisons Constance before D'Artagnan can rescue her. The musketeers arrest Milady before she reaches Cardinal Richelieu. They bring an official executioner, put her on trial, sentence her to death, and execute her. After her execution, the four friends return to the Siege of La Rochelle. The Cardinal's Guards arrest D’Artagnan and take him to the cardinal. When questioned about Milady's execution, D'Artagnan presents her letter of pardon as his own. Impressed with D'Artagnan's wilfulness and secretly glad to be rid of Milady, the Cardinal destroys the letter and writes a new order, giving the bearer a promotion to lieutenant in the Tréville company of musketeers, leaving the name blank. D'Artagnan offers the letter to Athos, Porthos and Aramis in turn but each refuses it; Athos because it is beneath him, Porthos because he is retiring to marry his wealthy mistress and Aramis because he is joining the priesthood. D'Artagnan, though heartbroken and full of regrets, finally receives the promotion he had coveted.

Characters

Musketeers
Athos – Comte de la Fère: he has never recovered from his marriage to Milady and seeks solace in wine. He becomes a father figure to d'Artagnan.
Porthos – M. du Vallon: a dandy, fond of fashionable clothes and keen to make a fortune for himself. The least cerebral of the quartet, he compensates with his homeric strength of body and character.  
Aramis – René d'Herblay, a handsome young man who hesitates between his religious calling and his fondness for women and scheming. 
D'Artagnan – Charles de Batz de Castelmore D'Artagnan: a young, foolhardy, brave and clever man seeking to become a musketeer in France.

Musketeers' servants
Planchet – a young man from Picardy, he is seen by Porthos on the Pont de la Tournelle spitting into the river below. Porthos takes this as a sign of good character and hires him on the spot to serve d'Artagnan. He turns out to be a brave, intelligent and loyal servant.
Grimaud – a Breton. Athos is a strict master and only permits his servant to speak in emergencies; he mostly communicates through sign language.
Mousqueton – originally a Norman named Boniface; Porthos, however, changes his name to one that sounds better. He is a would-be dandy, just as vain as his master. In lieu of pay, he is clothed and lodged in a manner superior to that usual for servants, dressing grandly in his master's old clothes.
Bazin – from the province of Berry, Bazin is a pious man who waits for the day his master (Aramis) will join the church, as he has always dreamed of serving a priest.

Others
Milady de Winter – a beautiful and evil spy of the Cardinal, she is also Athos's ex-wife. D'Artagnan impersonates a rival to spend a night with her, attracting her deadly hatred.
Rochefort is a more conventional agent of the Cardinal. Following their duel on the road to Paris, d'Artagnan swears to have his revenge. He loses several opportunities, but their paths finally cross again towards the end of the novel.
Constance Bonacieux – the queen's seamstress and confidante. After d'Artagnan rescues her from the cardinal's guard, he immediately falls in love with her. She appreciates his protection, but the relationship is never consummated.
Monsieur Bonacieux – Constance's husband. He initially enlists d'Artagnan's help to rescue his wife from the Cardinal's Guards, but when he himself is arrested, he and the Cardinal discover they have an understanding. Richelieu turns Monsieur Bonacieux against his wife and he goes on to play a role in her abduction.
Kitty – a servant of Milady de Winter. She dislikes her mistress and adores d'Artagnan.
Lord de Winter – brother of Milady's second husband, who died of a mysterious disease (apparently poisoned by Milady). He imprisoned Milady upon her arrival in England and decided to send her overseas in exile. Later, he took part in Milady's trial.

Historical characters
King Louis XIII of France – presented by Dumas as a fairly weak monarch often manipulated by his chief minister.
Queen Anne of Austria – the unhappy queen of France.
Cardinal Richelieu – Armand Jean du Plessis, the king's chief minister, who plots against the queen in resentment at having his advances rebuffed. Dumas describes him as being "36 or 37" though in 1625 Richelieu was 40.
M. de Tréville – captain of the musketeers and something of a mentor to d'Artagnan, though he has only a minor role.
George Villiers, 1st Duke of Buckingham – a handsome and charismatic man used to getting his way: he thinks nothing of starting a war between England and France for his personal convenience. His courtship of Anne of Austria gets her in trouble.
John Felton – a Puritan officer assigned to guard Milady and warned about her ways, he is nonetheless seduced and fooled by her in a matter of days and assassinates Buckingham at her request.

Editions
Les Trois Mousquetaires was translated into three English versions by 1846. One of these, by William Barrow (1817–1877), is still in print and fairly faithful to the original, available in the Oxford World's Classics 1999 edition. To conform to 19th-century English standards, all of the explicit and many of the implicit references to sexuality were removed, adversely affecting the readability of several scenes, such as the scenes between d'Artagnan and Milady.

There are 3 modern translations as well. One recent English translation is by Will Hobson in 2002.

Another is by Richard Pevear (2006), who, though applauding Barrow's work, states that most of the modern translations available today are "textbook examples of bad translation practices" which "give their readers an extremely distorted notion of Dumas' writing."

The most recent translation is by the American translator Lawrence Ellsworth (Lawrence Schick) published by Pegasus Books in February 2018 from the 1956 French edition.

Ellsworth decided to translate the full trilogy of The d'Artagnan Romances as well as the two novels of The Count of Moret for 21st century readers in 9 volumes, making it the first complete translation in over a century and a half. 6 out of 9 volumes have been published and the 7th volume is in progress in a serialized translation on Substack.

Adaptations

Film

The Three Musketeers (1921), a silent film adaptation starring Douglas Fairbanks.
The Three Musketeers (1939), a musical comedy adaptation starring Don Ameche and The Ritz Brothers.
The Three Musketeers (1948), a 1948 adaptation starring Van Heflin, Lana Turner, June Allyson, Angela Lansbury, Vincent Price, and Gene Kelly.
The Three Musketeers (1973), an adaptation by Richard Lester starring Oliver Reed, Frank Finlay, Richard Chamberlain and Michael York. This was only the first half of the Dumas novel, with the rest appearing in the following year's The Four Musketeers.
D'Artagnan and Three Musketeers (1978), a popular Soviet musical featuring Mikhail Boyarsky 
The Three Musketeers (1993), a 1993 Disney adaptation starring Charlie Sheen, Kiefer Sutherland, Oliver Platt and Chris O'Donnell.
The Musketeer, a 2001 film.
The Three Musketeers (2011), directed by Paul W. S. Anderson and starring Luke Evans, Ray Stevenson and Milla Jovovich.

Television
The novel has been adapted also for television in live action and animation.

Live action
The BBC has adapted the novel on three occasions.
The Three Musketeers, a 1954 BBC adaptation in six 30-minute episodes, starring Laurence Payne, Roger Delgado, Paul Whitsun-Jones and Paul Hansard
The Three Musketeers, a 1966 BBC adaptation in ten 25-minute episodes, directed by Peter Hammond and starring Jeremy Brett, Jeremy Young and Brian Blessed
 The Musketeers, a 2014 series by Adrian Hodges, is the newest BBC adaptation starring Tom Burke, Santiago Cabrera, Howard Charles and Luke Pasqualino as the titular musketeers.

Young Blades is an American/Canadian television series that aired on PAX in 2005. The series serves as a sequel to the novels, centered on the son of d'Artagnan, played by Tobias Mehler.

A series adapted for Korean history aired in 2014.

Animation
Walt Disney Productions produced a Silly Symphony cartoon called, Three Blind Mouseketeers, which is loosely based on the novel in 1936, in which the characters are depicted as anthropomorphic animals.

A two-part adaptation aired on The Famous Adventures of Mr. Magoo, with Magoo portraying D'Artagnan.

The Three Musketeers was a series of animated shorts produced by Hanna-Barbera as part of The Banana Splits Comedy-Adventure Hour and The Banana Splits & Friends show.

The Three Musketeers was a Hanna-Barbera animated special from 1973. It was part of the 1970s-80s CBS anthology series Famous Classic Tales that was produced by Hanna-Barbera's Australian division and often aired around the holidays between Thanksgiving and New Year's Day.

Dogtanian and the Three Muskehounds is a 1981 Spanish–Japanese anime adaptation, where the characters are anthropomorphic dogs. A sequel, The Return of Dogtanian, was released in 1989 by BRB Internacional, Thames Television and Wang Film Productions. Set 10 years after the original, it is loosely based on the novel The Vicomte de Bragelonne. A key difference between the two Dogtanian adaptions and Dumas' novel is that the character traits of Athos and Porthos were interchanged, making Athos the extrovert and Porthos the secretive noble of the group.

In 1989, Gakken produced a new anime adaptation called The Three Musketeers Anime, this time with human characters, which features several departures from the original.

Albert the Fifth Musketeer is a 1994 French animated series featuring a new musketeer, the titular Albert.

Mickey, Donald, Goofy: The Three Musketeers, a direct-to-video animated movie produced by Walt Disney Pictures and the Australian office of DisneyToon Studios, directed by Donovan Cook and released on 17 August 2004.

The Backyardigans had a 2009 episode in its third season by the name of The Two Musketeers; a third musketeer joins by the end of the episode.

A Barbie adaption of the tale by the name of Barbie and the Three Musketeers was released in 2009.

Stage
The first stage production was in Dumas' own lifetime as the opera Les Trois Mousquetaires with a libretto by Dumas himself and music by Albert Visetti.

The Three Musketeers is a musical with a book by William Anthony McGuire, lyrics by Clifford Grey and P. G. Wodehouse and music by Rudolf Friml. The original 1928 production ran on Broadway for 318 performances. A 1984 revival ran for 15 previews and 9 performances.

In 2003, a Dutch musical 3 Musketiers with a book by André Breedland and music & lyrics by Rob & Ferdi Bolland premiered, which went on to open in Germany (both the Dutch and German production starring Pia Douwes as Milady De Winter) and Hungary.

Playwright Peter Raby, composer George Stiles and lyricist Paul Leigh have written another adaptation titled The 3 Musketeers, One Musical For All, originally produced by the now defunct American Musical Theatre of San Jose.

In 2006, an adaptation by Ken Ludwig premiered at the Bristol Old Vic. In this version, d'Artagnan's sister Sabine, "the quintessential tomboy," poses as a young man and participates in her brother's adventures.

In 2018, The Dukes performed an outdoor promenade production in Williamson Park, Lancaster, adapted by Hattie Naylor: in this version d'Artagnan was a young woman aspiring to be a musketeer.

Video games and board games
In 1995, publisher U.S. Gold released Touché: The Adventures of the Fifth Musketeer by video game developers Clipper Software, a classic point-and-click adventure game. In 2005, Swedish developer Legendo Entertainment published the side-scrolling platform game The Three Musketeers for Windows XP and Windows Vista. In July 2009, a version of the game was released for WiiWare in North America and Europe under the title The Three Musketeers: One for All!. In 2009, Canadian developer Dingo Games self-published The Three Musketeers: The Game for Windows and Mac OS X. It is the first game to be truly based on the novel (in that it closely follows the novel's story). 2009 also saw the publication of the asymmetric team board game The Three Musketeers "The Queen's Pendants" (Настольная игра "Три мушкетера") from French designer Pascal Bernard by the Russian publisher Zvezda. In 2010, a co-operative game called "Mousquetaires du Roy" was released by Ystari and Rio Grande. The alternative spelling of "Roy" was taken from the old French and is rumoured to be preferred over the regular spelling because the publishers desire to have a letter "Y" in the name of the games they publish. Designed by François Combe and Gilles Lehmann for 1-5 players, the medium heavy game depicts the quest to retrieve the Queen's diamonds, while at the same time fending off disasters back in Paris. A sixth player expansion, called "Treville" was also made available in 2010.

In 2010, Anuman Interactive launched The Three Musketeers, a hidden object game on PC and MAC. Players follow d'Artagnan in his quest to become a king's musketeer.

Web series
In 2016, KindaTV launched a web series based on the story of The Three Musketeers, called "All For One". It follows a group of college students, mainly Dorothy Castlemore and is centred around a sorority- Mu Sigma Theta (MST). The majority of characters have been gender-swapped from the original story and most character names are based on the original characters.

It covers several themes including the LGBT community, mental health, long-distance relationships and college life.

Audio drama
In September 2019, Amazon released The Three Musketeers: an Audible Original Audio Drama, which follows the story of the book told from Milady's perspective.

In April 2021, Durham University Audio Society began releasing the first season of DUADS' The Three Musketeers.  The show originally aired on Durham University's student radio station, Purple Radio, and went on to be nominated for and receive several local awards.  The show remains faithful to the events of the novel, but adds in several adventures and touches on additional themes, including LGBT themes.  The first season covers the first arc of the book, the quest for the Queen's diamond studs. A second and third season are in the works.

In May 2022, Radio Mirchi Kolkata station aired The Three Musketeers in Bangla version, translated by Rajarshee Gupta for Mirchi's Sunday Suspense Programme. It was narrated by Deepanjan Ghosh. D'Artagnan was voiced by actor Rwitobroto Mukherjee. Athos was voiced by Gaurav Chakrabarty, Porthos by Agni, Aramis by Somak, King Louis XIII by Sayak Aman and Cardinal Richelieu by Mir Afsar Ali.

Other

Publisher Albert Lewis Kanter (1897–1973), created Classic Comics for Elliot Publishing Company in 1941 with its debut issues being The Three Musketeers. The Three Mouseketeers was the title of two series produced by DC Comics; the first series was a loose parody of The Three Musketeers. It was also made into motion comics in the Video Comic Book series 

In 1939, American author Tiffany Thayer published a book titled Three Musketeers (Thayer, 1939). This is a re-telling of the story in Thayer's words, true to the original plot but told in a different order and with different points of view and emphasis from the original.

Fantasy novelist Steven Brust's Khaavren Romances series have all used Dumas novels (particularly the D'Artagnan Romances) as their chief inspiration, recasting the plots of those novels to fit within Brust's established world of Dragaera. His 2020 novel The Baron of Magister Valley follows suit, using The Count of Monte Cristo as a starting point.

Sarah Hoyt wrote a series of historical murder mysteries with the musketeers as the protagonists. (Hoyt wrote the novels under the name Sarah d'Almeida.)

Tansy Rayner Roberts wrote Musketeer Space, a space opera retelling of the original book in which almost all characters have a different gender, as a weekly serialized novel from 2014 to 2016.

In popular culture

Literature
In the book The Assault, The Three Musketeers is quoted in the Prologue as the protagonist had the story read to him by Mr. Beumer, a lawyer who later becomes senile and in morbidity.

The American translator, Lawrence Ellsworth is currently translating The d'Artagnan Romances entirely and he has also written a 2-volume novel called The Rose Knight's Crucifixion that is a parallel novel to The Three Musketeers and most of the characters from The Three Musketeers and Sir Percy Blakeney from The Laughing Cavalier and The First Sir Percy by Baroness Orczy appear. The protagonist's physical appearance, however, is based on Quasimodo from Victor Hugo's The Hunchback of Notre-Dame.

Film and television
In the movie The Man in the Iron Mask, the aging musketeers come out of retirement and reunite to save France from the spoiled, cruel young King Louis XIV (played by Leonardo DiCaprio). The movie features Jeremy Irons as Aramis, John Malkovich as Athos, Gerard Depardieu as Porthos and Gabriel Byrne as D’Artagnan.

In Slumdog Millionaire, Jamal Malik's final question was to correctly identify the name of the third musketeer- which was Aramis. Jamal did so and won twenty million rupees.

In the film Django Unchained, one of the slaves, owned by Calvin Candie, is named D'Artagnan.

Video games
In Pokémon Black and White, the Pokémon Cobalion, Terrakion and Virizion, known as the Swords of Justice, are based on the Three Musketeers. Cobalion represents Athos, Terrakion represents Porthos and Virizion represents Aramis. The fourth Sword of Justice, Keldeo, represents d'Artagnan.

Music
The Smiths song You've Got Everything Now features the line: "I've seen you smile, but I've never really heard you laugh" and is borrowed from a narrative description of Athos:

Ppcocaine's song "Three Musketeers" shares little with the novel but its title.

References

External links

. Plain text format.

History of Dumas' Musketeers, shows links between the characters and actual history.
Comprehensive collection of Dumas links
The Three Musketeers. Scanned public domain editions in PDF format from Archive.org, some w/ illustrations, introductions and other helpful material.
"The Paris of The Three Musketeers", by E. H. Blashfield and E. W. Blashfield. Scribner's Magazine, August 1890. Cornell University Library.
Cooper, Barbara T., "Alexandre Dumas, père", in Dictionary of Literary Biography, Vol. 119: Nineteenth-Century French Fiction Writers: Romanticism and Realism, 1800–1860, edited by Catharine Savage Brosman, Gale Research, 1992, pp. 98–119.
Hemmings, F. W. J., "Alexandre Dumas Père", in European Writers: The Romantic Century, Vol. 6, edited by Jacques Barzun and George Stade, Charles Scribner's Sons, 1985, pp. 719–43.
Foote-Greenwell, Victoria, "The Life and Resurrection of Alexandre Dumas", in Smithsonian, July 1996, p. 110.
Thayer, Tiffany, Three Musketeers, New York: Citadel Press, 1939. (On the hard cover, the title is printed as Tiffany Thayer's Three Musketeers.)
Discussion of the work, bibliography and links
Bibliography and references for ''The Three Musketeers

 
1844 French novels
Fiction set in 1625
French adventure novels
French historical novels
French novels adapted into films
French novels adapted into plays
Novels adapted into comics
Novels adapted into video games
French novels adapted into television shows
Novels by Alexandre Dumas
Novels first published in serial form
Novels set in Early Modern France
Novels set in the 1620s
Works originally published in Le Siècle
1844 in France
Cultural depictions of Cardinal Richelieu
Cultural depictions of Louis XIII
Novels set in the 17th century
Musketeers of the Guard